Pasquale Chessa, born in Alghero, is an Italian historian and journalist.

He first appeared on cultural programs for the Italian National Radio and then, in turn, worked on the Italian magazines L'espresso, L'Europeo, Epoca and Panorama.

In 1995, he edited the speeches of the Italian President Francesco Cossiga titled Il torto e il diritto.

He authored in 1995 a book of interviews with the historian Renzo De Felice titled Rosso e il nero. Again with Cossiga, in 2003, he co-authored Per carità di Patria. On the theme of Italian history in the first half of the 20th century he has authored: in 2005 Guerra Civile 43–45 a photographic history; in 2007 Italiani sono sempre gli altri, with Francesco Cossiga; in 2008 Dux. Benito Mussolini a biography in pictures; in 2010 L'Ultima lettera di Benito with Barbara Raggi.

Released in the month preceding the historic 2013 reelection of President Giorgio Napolitano he is author of L'ultimo comunista. La presa del potere di Giorgio Napolitano His work is published in Italian with some translations into French.

He is currently director of the Alguer.it, the newspaper of Alghero in Sardinia and lives between Rome and Paris.

Works 

Il torto e il diritto, with Francesco Cossiga, Mondadori, 1993.
Rosso e nero, with Renzo De Felice, Milano, Baldini & Castoldi, 1997.
Interpretazioni su Renzo De Felice, with Francesco Villari, (contains essays by Denis Mack Smith, Marc Lazar and others), Baldini & Castoldi, 2002.
Per carità di patria: dodici anni di storia e politica italiana, 1992–2003, with Francesco Cossiga, Mondadori, 2003.
Guerra civile 1943-1945-1948 Mondadori, 2005.
Italiani sono sempre gli altri. Controstoria d'Italia da Cavour a Berlusconi, with Francesco Cossiga, Mondadori, 2007.
Dux. Benito Mussolini: una biografia per immagini Mondadori, 2008.
L'ultima lettera di Benito. Mussolini e Petacci: amore e politica a Salò 1943–45, with Barbara Raggi, Mondadori, 2010.
L'Ultimo Comunista. La presa del potere di Giorgio Napolitano, Chiarelettere, 2013

Prizes
Premio Acqui Storia 2002, popular section, with Interpretazioni su Renzo De Felice (Baldini & Castoldi)

References

1947 births
Living people
Italian journalists
Italian male journalists
Italian biographers
Male biographers
Italian male writers
Academic staff of the Sapienza University of Rome
People from Alghero